During the 1999–2000 English football season, Stockport County F.C. competed in the Football League First Division.

Season summary
In the 1999–2000 season, Andy Kilner replaced Gary Megson as Stockport's manager in the summer. Stockport had a brilliant first half of the campaign and on Boxing Day, they sat in the play-off places but afterwards came a dramatic slide in form with just 2 wins from the next 22 league games and Stockport finished the season in a disappointing 17th place.

Final league table

Results
Stockport County's score comes first

Legend

Football League First Division

FA Cup

League Cup

Squad

Left club during season

References

Stockport County F.C. seasons
Stockport County F.C.